Liat Towers is a shopping mall and mixed-use complex in Orchard Road, Singapore. It has 21 floors with offices, foodservice outlets, retail stores and embassies. It is located close to Orchard MRT station. The building was first constructed in 1965, before it was redeveloped into its current state in 1979.

History
Liat Towers first opened in September 1965, one of the first few malls to make its mark on Orchard Road. In 1977, a redevelopment was announced, which was completed in 1979.

First outlet milestones

McDonald's
It was the location of McDonald's first outlet in Singapore, which opened on 20 October 1979. It was also itself the first ever McDonald's outlet in a Southeast Asian country.

Starbucks
It was also the location of Starbucks' first outlet in Singapore, opening in December 1996. Similarly to McDonald's, it was the first ever Starbucks outlet in a Southeast Asian country. It was also the coffeehouse chain's 2nd ever overseas outlet outside of the United States, a time whereby Starbucks was not yet a household name. Starbucks still exists at Liat Towers, and its outlet was renovated in 2019.

Description
Some tenant retailers include Massimo Dutti, Zara and Hermes. It has a car park, and is in the middle of the prestigious Orchard shopping district of Singapore. 

The tower is also close by to other retail and service buildings in the city, such as several hotels, the most prominent example being the Mandarin Orchard Singapore, along with several well-known malls such as Ngee Ann City, Wisma Atria, ION Orchard and Hilton Singapore. Some of the restaurants in Liat Towers include Shake Shack, which occupies the same spot where Singapore's first McDonald's once stood.

Gallery

See also
Ngee Ann City
Wisma Atria
ION Orchard
Orchard MRT station
Hilton Singapore
List of shopping malls in Singapore
1979 in Singapore

Notes

References

Shopping malls in Singapore
Orchard Road